Daniel Udree (August 5, 1751 – July 15, 1828) was a Democratic-Republican member of the United States House of Representatives from Pennsylvania.

Biography
Born on August 5, 1751 in Philadelphia, Pennsylvania, Udree was raised in comfortable surroundings by his prosperous uncle, Jacob Winey, and was educated in the public schools of his community. As a young adult, he relocated to Berks County, Pennsylvania, where he became an iron merchant. 

Udree served in the American Revolution as a colonel. A participant in the Battle of Brandywine, his horse was shot from underneath him. He subsequently served as a major general in the War of 1812. 

He was elected to the 13th Congress to fill the vacancy caused by the resignation of John M. Hyneman, and served from October 12, 1813 to March 3, 1815. He was unsuccessful in his reelection bid in 1814. 

He was then elected to the 16th Congress to fill the vacancy caused by the resignation of Joseph Hiester, and served from December 26, 1820 to March 3, 1821. In 1822, he won election to the 18th Congress, which would begin on March 4, 1823.  

After the death of Representative Ludwig Worman on October 17, 1822, he won the special election for the seat for the remainder of the 17th Congress and was seated on December 10, 1822, serving until March 3, 1825. 

After his legislative career ended, he returned to work as a merchant.

Death and interment
He died in Reading, Pennsylvania on July 15, 1828, and was interred at the Oley Cemetery in Oley, Pennsylvania.

References

Politicians from Philadelphia
Politicians from Reading, Pennsylvania
1751 births
1828 deaths
Democratic-Republican Party members of the United States House of Representatives from Pennsylvania